The Best of the Chieftains is a 1992 compilation album consisting of songs from three of The Chieftains earlier solo albums, The Chieftains 7, The Chieftains 8 and The Chieftains 9: Boil the Breakfast Early.

Critical reception

Bruce Eder of AllMusic concludes his review by saying, "The material, a good distillation of the best of those three albums, all sounds fine and represents the group's virtuoso sound from this period."

William Ramoutar writes in his review of the album for Irish Culture and Customs, "This is when The Chieftains were at their strongest and stayed that way for many years. This is the way I want to remember The Chieftains."

Scott Hudson of Pop Matters says, "For the uninitiated, The Best of the Chieftains is great place to start, but by all means don't stop there."

Track listing

Musicians

Paddy Moloney – Uilleann pipes, tin whistle
Seán Keane – Fiddle
Mike Tubridy – Flute, tin whistle, concertina
Kevin Cunniffe – Bodhran (goatskin drum), vocals, lilting
Matt Malloy – Flute
Martin Fay – Fiddle
Derek Bell – Harp, timpan, oboe
Seán Potts – Tin whistle

Production

Lawrence Cohn – Digital Producer
David Mitson – Digital Remastering
Penny Armstrong – Product Mamager
Gina Companaro – Packaging Coordinator
Joel Zimmerman – Art Director
Cover photo courtesy of Shanachie Records

Track information and credits verified from the album's liner notes as well as Discogs, 45 Worlds and AllMusic.

References

External links
The Chieftains Official Site
Columbia Records Official Site

1992 compilation albums
Columbia Records compilation albums
The Chieftains albums